Street punk (sometimes alternatively spelled streetpunk) is an urban working class-based subgenre of punk rock, which partly emerged as a rebellion against the perceived artistic pretensions of the first wave of British punk. Street punk emerged from the style of Oi! and hardcore punk bands. A key band in defining the aesthetic was the Exploited. Street punks generally have a much more ostentatious and flamboyant appearance than the working class or skinhead image cultivated by many Oi! groups. Street punks commonly sported multi-coloured hair, mohawks, tattoos, heavily studded vests and leather jackets, and clothing, especially plaids, adorned with political slogans, patches, and/or the names of punk bands. In the 1990s and 2000s, a street punk revival began with emerging street punk bands such as the Casualties.

Characteristics

Street punk music is characterized by single-note guitar lines and short solos. Unlike similar genres, such as traditional hardcore punk, street punk bands sometimes consisted of two guitarists, one of which plays guitar melodies while not singing. Street punk also makes frequent use of communal vocals, gang vocals, and sing–along choruses. Street punk lyrics commonly address topics including fighting, drinking, partying, inner-city turmoil or personal relationships. Street punk bands sometimes express political viewpoints, typically of a left-wing variety, although some street punks eschew politics altogether in favor of a more hedonistic, nihilistic outlook. Street punk also had influences from New Wave of British Heavy Metal bands like Iron Maiden and Motörhead.

Punk veteran Felix Havoc said:

History

Origins (1980s)

UK 82

UK 82 (also known as UK hardcore or second wave punk) took the existing punk sound and added faster drumbeats and an aggressive distorted guitar sound. The term UK 82 is taken from the title of a song by the Exploited. Cross-pollination existed between this era of British street punk and American hardcore punk.

The lyrics of UK 82 bands tended to be much darker and more violent than the lyrics of earlier punk bands. They tended to focus on the possibilities of a nuclear holocaust, and other apocalyptic themes, partially due to the military tension of the Cold War atmosphere. The other mainstay of the lyrics of the era was unemployment, and the policies of the Conservative Party government. Lyrics frequently denounced the Conservative leader Margaret Thatcher in the same way that American hardcore punk bands addressed the Ronald Reagan administration.

The three most prominent UK82 bands, according to Ian Glasper, are the Exploited, Discharge, and GBH. The Exploited were controversial due to their aggressive lyrics and rowdy concerts, and were considered by Glasper to be "cartoon punks". Glasper wrote: "For many, The Exploited were the quintessential second wave punk band with their senses-searing high-speed outbursts against the system, and wild-eyed frontman Walter 'Wattie' Buchan's archetypal orange mohican." Discharge's early work proved to be enormously influential, providing the blueprint for an entire subgenre. Their later work, however, has been described as moving into heavy metal.

D-beat

D-beat (also known as Discore or käng (boot), in Sweden) was developed in the early 1980s by imitators of the band Discharge, for whom the genre is named. The first such group was the Varukers. The vocal content of D-beat tends towards shouted slogans. The style is distinct from its predecessors by its minimal lyrical content and greater proximity to heavy metal. It is closely associated with crust punk, which is a heavier, more complex variation. D-beat bands typically have anti-war, anarchist messages and closely follow the bleak nuclear war imagery of 1980s anarcho-punk bands. The style was particularly popular in Sweden, and was developed there by groups such as Anti Cimex and Mob 47.

Revival (1990s and 2000s)
In the 1990s, a new era of street punk began with emerging street punk bands like the Casualties and Rancid, The Casualties became one of the most well-known street punk bands and achieved underground success. Their 2004 album On the Front Line peaked at number 8 on the Independent Albums chart. On the Front Line and the Casualties' 2006 album Under Attack peaked at numbers 7 and 9 on the Heatseekers Albums chart, respectively.

See also
 Clockwork Orange punks
 List of street punk bands
 Oi!

References

Bibliography

 
Punk rock genres
British styles of music
British rock music genres